Carles, officially the Municipality of Carles,  is a 2nd class municipality in the province of Iloilo, Philippines. According to the 2020 census, it has a population of 72,637 people.

Located on Panay island, it is known for its rich fishing grounds.

History
Settlers first arrived circa 1846 and cleared an area at Punta Bulakawe, north of the current poblacion. Following an influx of settlers from Aklan and Antique, the settlement fell under Pueblo de Pilar, Capiz. About 10 years later, the settlement was transferred to the lowland and renamed to Badiang.

In 1860, the first attempt was made to convert the barrio into a municipality but the provincial government of Capiz refused. Because of this refusal, the town leaders petitioned the governor of Iloilo, Governor Jose Maria Carles, who approved the petition. On July 1, 1862, the new pueblo was inaugurated and renamed to Carles, in honor to the governor. First Gobernadorcillo was Alenjandro Buaya.

On January 1, 1904, the Municipio de Carles was demoted from a status of a Barrio to the status of a Barrio Balasan. This incident disheartened some Carleseños who migrated to other towns and provinces. But among those who stayed on were the strong willed ones who struggled hard to make Carles an independent municipality. Headed by Casimiro Andrada, the Carles Separation Movement succeeded in getting the approval of the Carleseños petition for separation from Balasan on January 1, 1920. Federico A. Ramos was appointed as the first Municipal President of Carles. It was during the incumbency of Municipal President Enrico Ilanga that the title of the municipal head was changed to Municipal Mayor and continued to be such until today.

Typhoon Haiyan
Carles was heavily damaged by Typhoon Haiyan. Buildings were destroyed and more than 1,200 people were displaced by the storm.

Geography

Climate

Barangays

Carles is politically subdivided into 33 Barangays.

Islands
Eighteen of Carles's barangays are spread out over fourteen islands and minor islets. The islands under Carles's political jurisdiction are:

Demographics

Economy

Carles is the 14th wealthiest town in Iloilo (based on income) in 2009, with an income total of P70,475,987 (2009)
The agricultural produce of the town includes fish, prawn, crab, rice, corn, sugar, cattle and poultry. Other industries include bakeries, shell craft and wood furniture.

Maritime resources
Carles is a significant center for commercial fishing, so much so that it carries the name 'Alaska of the Philippines' - reference to the area's marine resources. The reason for this is that Carles' water territory lies in the Visayan Sea triangle where the islands of Gigantes are located. As part of the Coral Triangle, these islands contain some of the most biologically diverse marine resources, and one of the most productive fishing grounds in the country. The imaginary triangle extends from the provinces of Iloilo, Negros, Cebu, Samar, and Masbate. This triangle is a part of the "Sulu-Sulaweisi Triangle" of the Sulu Sea and neighboring Indonesia where a large concentration of marine organisms coupled with climate conditions support a massive marine ecosystem. Various commercial species are harvested along Carles' waters, including mackerel, barracuda, sardines, shad, pompano, grouper, squid, cuttlefish, shrimp, prawns, shells, seaweed and others.

Infrastructure
'Bancal Fish Port' is the main fish-landing port in the municipality and is where fish catches from Iloilo, other Panay provinces, Masbate and Romblon are unloaded daily.

Tourism

Gigantes Group of Islands
One tourist destination in Western Visayas is the Islas de Gigantes or Higantes Group of Islands located in the second class municipality of Carles in northern Iloilo.

The Gigantes group of islands in Carles, Iloilo are endowed with limestone forests, caves, and white-sand beaches. It is classified as a high urgent conservation priority under the Philippine Biodiversity Conservation Priority-Setting Program (PBCPP). It is home to a variety of species, two of them endemic: the Gekkonid Lizard (Gekko gigante) and the Island Forest Frog (Platymantis insulatus).

Sicogon Island
Sicogón is an island in northern Iloilo, which is part of the municipality of Carles. It is named after cogon, a type of grass found in abundance on the island. According to the 2010 census, it has a population of 5,238.

Sicogon was a popular tourist destination during the 1970s, known for its clear waters and white sand beach lined with coconut trees. However, due to the situation caused by martial law, development stalled and Sicogon's popularity faded in favor of Boracay Island.

Municipal Tourism Center
Located at Bancal Port, Carles Iloilo is a Tourist assistance, boat reservation, registration and payment center,  they also regulates the rates and accredited the boats for the Gigantes tours. souvenir items can also be found in the center.

Gallery

Transport
Iloilo International Airport  serves the city of Iloilo as well as the province of Iloilo. It receives flights from Manila, Cebu, Cagayan de Oro, Davao City, General Santos, Tacloban, Puerto Princesa, Singapore and Hong Kong and is served by three airlines; Philippines AirAsia, Cebu Pacific, and Philippine Airlines.

Roxas Airport  is near to Carles with domestic flights from Cebu and Manila

Sicogon Airport  is the first and only airport in Carles and Northern Iloilo with domestic flights from and to Manila.

Jeepneys and tricycles are the common public land transport with route Carles-Balasan and vice versa. The route Carles- Iloilo City and vice versa, and Carles- Roxas City and vice versa is served by Ceres Liner while Carles- Metro Manila and vice versa is served by Dimple Star Bus.

Pumboats are used for transversing the water between the Islands of Carles and Its Mainland with Estancia. Bancal port serves as the gateway to Gigantes Islands.

References

External links

 Iloilo Travel Guide Website
 [ Philippine Standard Geographic Code]
 Philippine Census Information
 Local Governance Performance Management System

Municipalities of Iloilo